Lincoln Township is a township in Daviess County, in the U.S. state of Missouri.

Lincoln Township was established in 1866, and named after President Abraham Lincoln.

References

Townships in Missouri
Townships in Daviess County, Missouri